Oliver Partington (born 3 September 1998) is a professional rugby league footballer who plays as a  and  for the Salford Red Devils in the Betfred Super League and the England Knights at international level.

He has previously played for the Wigan Warriors in the Super League, and spent time on loan from Wigan at the Swinton Lions in the Championship, and the London Skolars in Betfred League 1.

Background
Partington was born in Billinge, Merseyside, England.

Career
In 2018 he made his Super League début for Wigan against the Castleford Tigers.

He played in the 2020 Super League Grand Final which Wigan lost 8-4 against St Helens.

In September 2022 he signed for the Salford Red Devils on a two-year deal.

International career
In 2019 he was selected for the England Knights against Jamaica at Headingley Rugby Stadium.

References

External links

Wigan Warriors profile
SL profile

1998 births
Living people
England Knights national rugby league team players
London Skolars players
Rugby league players from Wigan
Rugby league props
Salford Red Devils players
Swinton Lions players
Wigan Warriors players